Ifill is a surname. Notable people with the surname include:

 Gwen Ifill (1955–2016), American journalist
 Kerryann Ifill, 2012 nominated President of the Senate of Barbados
 Nicholas Ifill (born 1968), Barbadian-born Canadian cricketer
 Paul Ifill (born 1979), Barbadian football player
 Sherrilyn Ifill, law professor and President and Director-Counsel of the NAACP Legal Defense Fund

Earl Ifill, African Methodist Episcopal Church Presiding Elder.

 Ifil